Robert Gage II (January 15, 1927 – April 19, 2005) was an American football player who played two seasons in the NFL with the Pittsburgh Steelers.

Early life
Gage was born in Chester, South Carolina.  He attended Boys High School in Anderson, South Carolina.

He matriculated at Clemson University.

Football  career
Gage was selected sixth overall by the Pittsburgh Steelers in the 1949 NFL Draft.  He was also selected by the Baltimore Colts of the All-America Football Conference.

He played two seasons for the Steelers at tailback, quarterback and defensive back.  In the penultimate game of the  season, Gage set a franchise record which still stands with a 97-yard run on a fake punt.  This run also tied the league record at the time which was held by the Green Bay Packers' Andy Uram.  The record stood until , when Tony Dorsett scored from 99 yards out.

Gage retired from football after two season to devote more time to his family and his off-season job as an executive at a South Carolina textile firm.

Personal
Gage married Patricia "Patsy" McGarahan in 1947.  The couple had six children, four girls and two boys.

After finishing his football career, Gage had a forty-year career at Chemurgy Products in Greenville, South Carolina.

Gage died of an apparent heart attack at his home in Greenville on April 19, 2005.

References

1927 births
2005 deaths
People from Chester, South Carolina
Players of American football from South Carolina
American football running backs
American football quarterbacks
American football defensive backs
Clemson Tigers football players
Pittsburgh Steelers players